InGladAloneness is an EP by Dalis Car, a collaboration between Peter Murphy of Bauhaus and Mick Karn of Japan.

Background
In August 2010, Murphy announced on Twitter that he and Karn were planning to head into the studio in September to begin work on the second Dalis Car album. The project was cut short, however, as Karn had recently been diagnosed with cancer. He died on 4 January 2011. The recordings feature Karn's Japan bandmate Steve Jansen on drums and original Dalis Car drummer Paul Lawford on congas.

Release
The track "Artemis Rise" was first made available as a download through the Burning Shed MK Music store on 24 July 2011, to commemorate what would have been Karn's 53rd birthday. The song is an updated version of the song "Artemis" from their 1984 album The Waking Hour, with added vocals by Murphy, drums by Jansen and guitar by Jakszyk. 

"Artemis Rise", along with four other tracks, were released as the InGladAloneness EP on 5 April 2012. The tracks were mixed by Jansen, mastered by Pieter Snapper in Istanbul and the artwork for the EP was created by Thomas Bak with a painting by Jarosław Kukowski. The Japanese version of the EP contains a memorial photo booklet with photos of Karn by Steve Jansen, along with comments from artists who had collaborated with him.

The first 250 copies were signed by Jansen.

Track listing

Personnel
Peter Murphy – vocals, keyboards
Mick Karn – bass, bass clarinet, additional guitars

Additional musicians
Steve Jansen – drums
Jakko M Jakszyk – nylon acoustic guitars, electric guitars, guzheng
Theo Travis – saxophones, flute
Şengül – additional vocals on "Subhanallah"
Gill Morley – violin
Ellen Blair – violin, viola
Pete Lockett – percussion
Paul Lawford – congas
Steve D'Agostino – additional keyboards

Technical
Jarosław Kukowski – painting
Thomas Bak – artwork
Steve Jansen – string arrangement on "If You Go Away", mixing
Jakko M Jakszyk – string arrangements
Pieter Snapper – mastering

References 

2012 debut EPs
Dalis Car albums